Thinc is a thin client protocol, currently at the research stage. Thinc is capable of playing full screen video and sound remotely which is notably a difficult problem for thin client protocols. There is a working VMware appliance available which runs Debian Sid. The appliance also works in VirtualBox.

See also

 Comparison of remote desktop software
 X Window System

External links 
 Columbia University Department of Computer Science - Network Computing Lab
 Ricardo Baratto, "THINC: A Virtual and Remote Display Architecture for Desktop Computing and Mobile Devices", Ph.D. Thesis

Remote desktop
Thin clients